The canton of Monistrol-sur-Loire is an administrative division of the Haute-Loire department, south-central France. Its borders were modified at the French canton reorganisation which came into effect in March 2015. Its seat is in Monistrol-sur-Loire.

It consists of the following communes:
La Chapelle-d'Aurec
Monistrol-sur-Loire
Saint-Maurice-de-Lignon
Les Villettes

References

Cantons of Haute-Loire